Novosaitovo (Yañı Säyet) is a rural locality (a village) in Kulguninsky Selsoviet, Ishimbaysky District, Bashkortostan, Russia. The population was 111 as of 2010. There are 2 streets.

Geography 
Novosaitovo is located 101 km east of Ishimbay (the district's administrative centre) by road. Bretyak is the nearest rural locality.

References 

Rural localities in Ishimbaysky District